Jalabert is a last name that could refer to:
Charles Jalabert (1819–1901), French painter in the academic style.
Laurent Jalabert (born 1968), French former professional cyclist
Luc Jalabert (1951-2018), French bullfighter
Nicolas Jalabert (born 1973), French cyclist, brother of Laurent